Victoire Terminus is a French 2008 documentary film about women's boxing in Kinshasa.

Synopsis 
Summer 2006, Kinshasa. Martini, Jeannette, Hélène and Rosette spend everyday sparring with Coach Judex in the old Tata Rafael stadium; the same one where Muhammad Ali knocked out George Foreman in 1974 during one of the most legendary matches in boxing. At dawn, thousands of people from the ghetto come to train and political parties rally. While others fight for the Presidency of Congo, Judex struggles to organise a woman's boxing tournament with very little money... Kinshasa sings, Kinshasa starves and Judex's girls try to survive, they're realistic but still full of hope. A film about women in a country where men have gone crazy.

Awards 
 London Film Festival (2008)

References

External links

2008 films
French documentary films
2008 documentary films
Documentary films about women's boxing
2000s French-language films
Films set in the Democratic Republic of the Congo
Sport in Kinshasa
Women in the Democratic Republic of the Congo
Films shot in the Democratic Republic of the Congo
2000s French films